Daniil Markov may refer to:
 Danny Markov, Russian ice hockey player
 Daniil Markov (swimmer), Russian swimmer